Mohamed Salah Elneel (born 20 April 1991) is a Qatari footballer. He currently plays for Al Arabi.

References

External links
 

1991 births
Living people
Qatari footballers
Association football wingers
Al-Rayyan SC players
Al-Sailiya SC players
Al-Shahania SC players
Al-Markhiya SC players
Al-Arabi SC (Qatar) players
Qatar Stars League players
Footballers at the 2010 Asian Games
Asian Games competitors for Qatar
Qatar international footballers